Yury Soltanbekovich Gusov (18 March 1940 – 8 March 2002) was a Russian welterweight freestyle wrestler who competed in the 1972 Summer Olympics. He won a world title in 1971 and a European title in 1969, finishing second in 1968.

References

1940 births
2002 deaths
Sportspeople from Vladikavkaz
Olympic wrestlers of the Soviet Union
Wrestlers at the 1972 Summer Olympics
Soviet male sport wrestlers
Russian male sport wrestlers
National University of Ukraine on Physical Education and Sport alumni